Happe or Happé is a German surname. Notable people with the surname include:

Alain Happe, French football director
Dan Happe (born 1998), English footballer
Francesca Happé (born 1967), British neuroscientist
Hendrik Happé (1884–1962), Dutch architect
Markus Happe (born 1972), German footballer
Thomas Happe (born 1958), West German handball player
Ursula Happe (1926–2021), German swimmer

Surnames
German-language surnames
Surnames of German origin